Berthon may refer to:

People with the surname
André Berthon (1882–1968), French politician
Edward Lyon Berthon (1813 London–1899), English inventor and clergyman
Eliot Berthon (born 1992), French ice hockey player
George Théodore Berthon (1806–1892), French painter
Laurie Berthon (born 1991), French track cyclist
Nathanaël Berthon (born 1989), French racing driver
Paul Berthon (1872–1909), French Art Nouveau artist
Paul Émile Berthon (1846–?), French landscape painter
René Théodore Berthon (1776–1859), French painter
Stephen Berthon (1922–2007), English vice admiral

Other
Berthon Boat, lifeboat